SiddalaKona is located in Nellore district of the Indian state of Andhra Pradesh. It is located near Sydapuram. It is a Jain Heritage site, cave and temple, built on a rock.

References

Jain temples in Andhra Pradesh
Buildings and structures in Nellore district